The Columbia University School of Social Work is the graduate school of social work of
Columbia University. It is the nation's oldest social work program, with roots extending back to 1898, when the New York Charity Organization Society's first summer course was announced in The New York Times and began awarding the Master of Science (MS) degree in 1940. With an enrollment of over 900, it is one of the largest social work schools in the United States.  The combination of its age and size has led to the School becoming a repository for much of the reference literature in the social work field.

History
In 1898, the Charity Organization Society established the first Summer School in Philanthropic Work at 105 East 22nd Street in New York. Twenty-five men and women attended the first classes. The Summer School continued as the primary training source until 1904. That year, it expanded the coursework as the first full-time course of graduate study at the newly renamed New York School of Philanthropy.

The name of the School was changed in 1917 to the New York School of Social Work. The Landmark Bureau of Children's Guidance was established in 1922. In 1931, the School moved into the Russell Sage Building at 122 East 22nd Street. In 1935, the School played a role in writing and implementing the Social Security Act.

In 1940, the School was affiliated with Columbia University as one of its graduate schools and began awarding the Master of Science (MS) degree. The first doctoral degree was awarded in 1952, raising the academic level of social work. In 1949, the School moved to the Andrew Carnegie Mansion at 2 East 91st Street, and later to McVickar Hall on 113th Street near Columbia’s Morningside Heights campus.

In 1961, the School formed a coalition in support of President John F. Kennedy establishing the Peace Corps. In 1963 the name of the school was formally changed to Columbia University School of Social Work. In 1966, building on its pioneering work with children, the school launched a major longitudinal study of foster children, their families and the agencies serving them.

The first fully endowed professorship was set up in 1991, followed by the full endowment of the Kenworthy Chair and nine additional endowed professorships. In 1997, an agreement was concluded with the UN Economic and Social Council (ECOSOC) to provide new program support and a fellowship. In that year, the school's endowment surpassed $40 million.

In 1992, students of the school organized protests and teach-ins as part of a nationwide effort to protest welfare cuts. The organizers of the school's events called the welfare cuts an example of the demonization of people on welfare.

In 2002, construction of the current School of Social Work building began on Amsterdam Avenue near Columbia's campus. The building was completed in 2004 and first used by students and faculty during the Fall semester of the 2004-2005 academic year.

In 2007, the School founded the Global Health Research Center of Central Asia to develop and advance evidence-based, sustainable solutions to emerging public health and social issues in the region, receiving funding from the National Institutes of Health.

In 2012, the Columbia Social Work School established the Fisher Cummings Washington Fellows Program with a major gift. The program funds select students for a semester-long internship in Washington, D.C., with an emphasis on working to promote social justice and the well-being of women, children, and families at the federal level.

In 2014, the School opened its Online Campus for earning a Master's of Science in Social Work (MSSW) from various major cities across the United States.

Achievements

The Columbia University School of Social Work has played a significant role in advancing the profession of social work and raising public consciousness of social services, both in the U.S. and beyond. In addition to being the oldest and largest school of social work in the United States, the School has had many notable achievements in developing social security policy, furthering advances in social work education and fostering social change.

CUSSW is ranked fourth best in the country, according to U.S. News & World Report rankings of "America's Best Graduate Schools in 2008." Columbia University School of Social Work is also ranked #1 for "Best Online Social Work Degree Programs," and #2 for "Best International Social Work Degree Programs," by Social Work Degree Center's Guide to Social Work Education.

The Columbia University School of Social Work's mission focuses on: 
 the development of leaders in social work practice and research;
 the advancement of the social work profession, professional values, knowledge, and skills; and
 the enhancement of well-being and the promotion of human rights and social justice at the local, national, and global level through the creation of responsive social programs and policies. 
In the field of national social security policy, members of the School faculty assisted Roosevelt's Secretary of Labor, Frances Perkins to write and implement the Social Security Act. During and after World War II, the School staff helped to extend the social work role into the military. The School's 1966 study on foster children and their parents has also had a major impact on national policy.

The School has initiated many advances in social work education: 
 requiring fieldwork instruction in social work education; 
 pioneering psychiatric social work; and 
 introducing the first curriculum on social work in the workplace.  
 In 2003, the School began publishing the Journal of Student Social Work  The Journal is a scholarly publication featuring articles related to all aspects of the social work profession, including clinical practice, public policy, and administration. In 2010 The Journal was renamed the Columbia Social Work Review  and the Review launched its Volume I in the Spring of 2010. The Review is a yearly publication for students in the field of social work to share their research, experiences and views with faculty, fellow students, and the wider scholarly community.

Over the years, the School has contributed numerous leaders in social work education. Its graduates hold thirty-nine deanships in schools of social work around the world. The School has been an active force in social change. It has been instrumental in forming coalitions to lead national movements for change, such as the Urban League and the White House Conferences on Children and Youth. The School was one of the first to develop an ecological approach to social work.

Notable alumni and faculty
 Vera Shlakman (1909-2017), was a distinguished professor emerita and leftist economist who overcame political persecution and Antisemitism to return to teaching at CSSW. She earned her doctorate in economics from Columbia, where she wrote her dissertation on female factory workers in the 1800s. She would expand her analysis in her influential book Economic History of a Factory Town (1935), which provided a touchstone in the study of workplace conditions, family life, and relations between capital and labor. She was best known for her firing by Queens College in 1952 for refusing to testify to the McCarran Committee on whether she was a card-carrying Communist, as well as for their apology and restitution she received in 1982.
Shirley Zussman (1914–2021), sex therapist
 Alfred J. Kahn (1918-2009), received the school's first doctorate granted in the field of social welfare policy and served on the school's faculty for 57 years. He was critical of problems at the local and federal governmental level in providing services related to child development and family support, arguing that a comprehensive system of social welfare provision should be made available to all Americans comparable to similar systems offered in Western Europe.
 Judith Wallerstein (1921-2012), received her MSW from the school in 1947 and became a leading psychologist who pioneered research on divorce. She created a 25-year study on the effects of divorce on the children involved, finding that the consequences of divorce cause pain for the children well into adulthood. Her research made her a polarizing figure among feminists and sparked a national debate in regards to the rising divorce rate in America.
 Jared Bernstein, received his Ph.D. in Social Welfare from the school. He is a Senior Fellow at the Center on Budget and Policy Priorities and former Chief Economist and Economic Adviser to Vice President Joseph Biden in the Obama Administration. His federal appointment represented a progressive perspective and provided a strong advocate for workers. His work focuses on federal, state and international economic policies, specifically the middle class squeeze, income inequality and mobility, trends in employment and earnings, low-wage labor markets, poverty, and international comparisons.
 Ada Deer, Native American advocate and scholar, received her MSW from the school in 1961. She became the first woman to be appointed Assistant Secretary of Indian Affairs, US Department of the Interior, the first Native American woman to run for Congress in Wisconsin, the first native American to lobby Congress successfully to restore tribal rights, and the first Chairwoman of her Menominee tribe.
 Winona Cargile Alexander (1893-1984), a founder of Delta Sigma Theta, was the first African American accepted to the New York School of Philanthropy in 1915. After graduation, she was the first black hired by the New York City and New York County Charities. She made most of her social work and civic contributions in Jacksonville, Florida.
 Antonia Pantoja (1922-2002), received her MSW from the school in 1954. She was regarded by many in the Puerto Rican Latino community as one of the most important civil rights leaders in the United States. She founded ASPIRA and received the Presidential Medal of Freedom from President Clinton in 1997.
 Ann Klein (1923–1986), politician who served in the New Jersey General Assembly and was the first woman to run for Governor of New Jersey.
 Jane Waldfogel, Compton Foundation Centennial Professor of Social Work for the Prevention of Children's and Youth Problems at the Columbia University School of Social Work. Her research focuses on work-family policies, improving the measurement of poverty, and understanding social mobility across countries and child welfare. She has published many studies about the impact of public policies on child and family well-being.
Kathy Boudin, adjunct assistant professor and Director of the Criminal Justice Initiative. She is known for her association with the Weather Underground and was convicted in 1984 of felony murder for her participation in an armed robbery that resulted in the killing of two police officers and a security guard. She was released from prison in 2003. Boudin works for the Center for Comprehensive Care, HIV AIDS Center, at Mount Sinai Morningside and is a consultant to the Osborne Association in the development of a Longtermers Responsibility Project.
 Herman D. Stein (1917-2009), taught at the school for 14 years, as well as at Smith, Harvard, and Case Western Reserve University, where he was dean of the Mandel School of Applied Social Sciences during the 1960s.
 Jaime Soto, Bishop of the Roman Catholic Diocese of Sacramento, has been known for advocating for the rights of the poor and defending immigrants.
 Jeanette Takamura, first female Dean of the School of Social Work. She was appointed by President Clinton as Assistant Secretary for Aging at the U.S. Department of Health and Human Services. She led the development and enactment of a modernized Older Americans Act and established the National Family Caregiver Support Program, the federal government's first formal recognition of the significant contributions and needs of family caregivers.
 Robert Lee Barker, received his Ph.D. from the school, and created The Social Work Dictionary, now the definitive reference resource in the profession throughout the world. He was an early advocate and systematizer for the case management approach to delivering social services, for private practice in social work, and for the emerging field of forensic social work.
 Mary Antoinette Cannon (1884-1962), president of the American Association of Hospital Social Workers (1922-1923)
 Helen Rehr (1919-2013), longtime director of social work at Mount Sinai Hospital
Mary van Kleeck, a prominent social scientist of the 20th century, taught a series of courses at the school from 1914 to 1917.
Monique Holsey-Hyman, social worker and professor who serves on the Durham City Council

References

External links

Columbia University School of Social Work
Columbia Social Work Review
 Columbia University Partnership for International Development 
"America's Best Graduate Schools", US News & World Report]

Columbia University
Schools of social work in the United States
1898 establishments in New York City
Educational institutions established in 1898